Maternus Pistor (1470–1534) was a Roman Catholic prelate who served as Auxiliary Bishop of Mainz (1534).

Biography
Maternus Pistorr was born in Ingweiler, Germany in 1470.  On 19 Jan 1534, he was appointed during the papacy of Pope Clement VII as Auxiliary Bishop of Mainz and Titular Bishop of Ascalon. He served as Auxiliary Bishop of Mainz until his death on 5 Sep 1534.

References

External links and additional sources
 (for Chronology of Bishops) 
 (for Chronology of Bishops)  

16th-century German Roman Catholic bishops
Bishops appointed by Pope Clement VII
1534 deaths
1470 births